1921 Sultan Hussein Cup Final, was the final match of the 1920–21 Sultan Hussein Cup, was between El-Mokhtalat (Zamalek SC now) and Sherwood Foresters from Great Britain, El-Mokhtalat won the match 2–1 after extra time  (1–1 before extra time), became the 1st Egyptian team to win the cup.

Route to the final

Match details

See also
 Sultan Hussein Cup

References

External links
 http://www.angelfire.com/ak/EgyptianSports/ZamalekInSultanCup.html#1921

1
SHC 1922